Église Saint-Pierre-et-Saint-Paul is the Catholic parish church of the village of Neuwiller-lès-Saverne, in the Bas-Rhin department of France.

Formerly the church of a rich Benedictine abbey founded in 726, it is surrounded by buildings and ruins that had once belonged to the same order. Thanks to its Romanesque parts, the church is a stage on the Romanesque Road of Alsace. It is classified as a monument historique by the French Ministry of Culture since 1840, making it a part of the very first list of such heritage buildings.

Architecture
The church's exterior architecture is strikingly clear-cut, insofar as its visible parts are growing younger from East to West, or older from West to East. The purely Romanesque superposed chapels behind the choir date from the 11th century; the choir itself, the transept and the easternmost bay of the nave date from the late 12th and early 13th century and reflect a transitional style between Romanesque and Gothic architecture; the rest of the nave was rebuilt later in the 13th century, in a sober but well defined Gothic style; while the facade with its porch tower was rebuilt between 1768 and 1773 in the Louis Quinze style. The crossing tower was modified by architect Émile Boeswillwald during a restoration campaign in the years 1852–1858. Interestingly, the former church of the nearby Marmoutier Abbey has an identical architectural history, but in reverse: the western part is Romanesque, the nave is Gothic and the choir was rebuilt in the 18th century. Each church also has a crypt that is even older than the surfacing parts (in Neuwiller's case, it dates from the 9th century).

Description
The church holds the relics of Saint Adelphus since the first half of the 9th century. In the Middle Ages, these relics had become so popular with pilgrims that the Benedictines built a second church nearby (1190–1225, now the village's Protestant church) specially to serve as a shrine, so as to remain undisturbed in their own sanctuary. The reliquary of Saint Adelphus was later moved back into Saint-Pierre-et-Saint-Paul in the 19th century, after the dissolution of the abbey following the French Revolution.

Among the many works of art inside the former abbey church, the four, late 15th or early 16th-century tapestries depicting the life and the miracles of Adelphus, on display in the upper of the superposed Romanesque chapels (dedicated to Saint Sebastian), are perhaps the most notable. A strikingly gory scene depicts a knight being forced by divine wrath to devour his own hand after having tried to break the saint's sarcophagus. The 12th-century baptismal fonts, the 14th-century statue of the Virgin and Child, the 1478 Entombment of Christ, and the 18th-century carved choir stalls are also especially noteworthy. All these objects are classified as monuments historiques.

Gallery

References

External links 

Restoration of the church (ongoing), 24 June 2016
Restoration of the church (ongoing), Les Dernières Nouvelles d'Alsace, 16 July 2016
Restoration of the church (finished), Les Dernières Nouvelles d'Alsace, 22 June 2019

Monasteries in France
Monuments historiques of Bas-Rhin
Romanesque architecture in France
Gothic architecture in France
Pilgrimage churches
Roman Catholic churches in France
Neoclassical church buildings in France